This article is about the particular significance of the year 1862 to Wales and its people.

Incumbents

Lord Lieutenant of Anglesey – Henry Paget, 2nd Marquess of Anglesey 
Lord Lieutenant of Brecknockshire – John Lloyd Vaughan Watkins
Lord Lieutenant of Caernarvonshire – Sir Richard Williams-Bulkeley, 10th Baronet 
Lord Lieutenant of Cardiganshire – Edward Pryse
Lord Lieutenant of Carmarthenshire – John Campbell, 2nd Earl Cawdor 
Lord Lieutenant of Denbighshire – Robert Myddelton Biddulph   
Lord Lieutenant of Flintshire – Sir Stephen Glynne, 9th Baronet
Lord Lieutenant of Glamorgan – Christopher Rice Mansel Talbot
Lord Lieutenant of Merionethshire – Edward Lloyd-Mostyn, 2nd Baron Mostyn 
Lord Lieutenant of Monmouthshire – Benjamin Hall, 1st Baron Llanover
Lord Lieutenant of Montgomeryshire – Thomas Hanbury-Tracy, 2nd Baron Sudeley  
Lord Lieutenant of Pembrokeshire – William Edwardes, 3rd Baron Kensington 
Lord Lieutenant of Radnorshire – John Walsh, 1st Baron Ormathwaite
Bishop of Bangor – James Colquhoun Campbell 
Bishop of Llandaff – Alfred Ollivant 
Bishop of St Asaph – Thomas Vowler Short 
Bishop of St Davids – Connop Thirlwall

Events

1 January – South Wales Railway leased to Great Western Railway prior to merger.
19 February – Gethin Pit disaster, Abercanaid: the first of two firedamp explosions at this colliery near Merthyr Tydfil kills 47 men and boys.
5 May – Henry Austin Bruce, 1st Baron Aberdare, makes an important speech on the subject of education in Wales. He is later appointed vice-president of the Committee of Council on Education.
2 June – Llangollen is linked to the rail network for the first time.
4 July – Sarah Edith Wynne, noted soprano, makes her London début.
c. August – First train through the Brecon and Merthyr Tydfil Junction Railway's Torpantau Tunnel.
7 August – Ferry from Porthmadog to Talsarnau sinks with the loss of 8 lives.
28 October – The incomplete Moel Famau Jubilee Tower collapses in a storm.
1 December – Great Orme's Head lighthouse at Llandudno, erected by the Mersey Docks and Harbour Board, is first illuminated.
Guillermo Rawson, Interior Minister of Argentina, meets Love Jones-Parry and Lewis Jones to discuss the Welsh colonisation of Patagonia.
The Clogau mine begins producing gold.
Snowdon Mill, a steam-powered flour mill, is opened at Porthmadog.

Arts and literature
"Religion", by Joseph Edwards, and "The Tinted Venus" by John Gibson are among sculptures shown at the Great Exhibition.

Awards
National Eisteddfod of Wales is held at Caernarfon. The chair is won by Rowland Williams (Hwfa Môn).

New books

English language
George Borrow – Wild Wales
Rees Howell Gronow – Reminiscences of Captain Gronow
Jane Williams (Ysgafell) – Celtic Fables, Fairy Tales and Legends versified

Welsh language
John Ceiriog Hughes – Oriau'r Bore

Music
Henry Brinley Richards – "God Bless the Prince of Wales"
Ebenezer Thomas (Eben Fardd) – Hymnau

Sport
Cricket
21 July – South Wales Cricket Club defeat Surrey at The Oval.
24 July – South Wales Cricket Club defeat MCC at Lord's.

Births
5 January – John Fisher, Celtic scholar (d. 1930)
16 January – Leifchild Jones, 1st Baron Rhayader, politician (d. 1939)
17 January – Buckley Roderick, Wales international rugby player (d. 1908)
23 January – Evan Richards, Wales international rugby player (d. 1931)
1 February – Thomas Pryce-Jenkins, Wales international rugby player (d. 1922)
16 February 
Llewellyn John Montfort Bebb, academic (d. 1915)
Philip Tanner, folk singer (d. 1950)
22 March – Edward Treharne, Wales international rugby player (d. 1904)
11 April – Charles Evans Hughes, American politician of Welsh parentage (d. 1948)
27 April – Sir Hugh Vincent, solicitor and Wales international rugby player (d. 1931)
28 April – William Norton, Wales international rugby player (d. 1898)
17 May – Sir William Rice Edwards, surgeon (d. 1923)
5 August - Robert Mills-Roberts, footballer (d. 1935)
16 September – Thomas Baker Jones, Wales international rugby player (d. 1959)
27 October – Sir Hugh Evan-Thomas, admiral (d. 1928)
16 November – Sir David Rocyn-Jones, medical practitioner and President of the WRU (d. 1953)
7 December – Humphrey Jones, footballer (d. 1946)
9 December – John John Evans, journalist (d. 1942)
date unknown
John Daniel Evans, Patagonia settler (d. 1943)
Seth Powell, footballer (d. 1945)

Deaths
3 January – Dan Jones, Mormon missionary, 51
8 February - Hans Busk, poet, 89
25 March – Timothy Davies, clergyman
1 May – Frederick Richard West, politician, 62/63
28 May – James Henry Cotton, Dean of Bangor, 82
2 August – Anthony Hill, industrialist, 78
27 August – John Williams (Ab Ithel), antiquary, 51
9 December – Edward Hughes (Eos Maldwyn), harpist, age unknown (tuberculosis)
31 December – Daniel Jones, Baptist minister, 74
date unknown – Robert Edwards, hymn writer, 66?

References

 
Wales